The following is a timeline of the history of the city of Zaragoza, Spain.

Prior to 20th century

 25 BCE - Town becomes a Roman colony, named "."
 452 CE - Suebi in power.
 476 CE - Visigoths in power.
 712 - Moors in power. Beginning of Islamic period in the town.
 778 - Forces of Charlemagne attempt to take Saragossa; inspires French poem The Song of Roland.
 11th century - Aljafería palace built.
 1018 - Taifa of Zaragoza established.
 1118 - Alfonso I of Aragon in power. End of Islamic period in the town.
 1318 - Roman Catholic Archdiocese of Zaragoza established.
 1343 - Santa Fe Abbey founded (approximate date).
 1376 - La Seo Cathedral built.
 1447 - Puente de Piedra (bridge) built.
 1469 - Royal court relocated from Saragossa to Castile.
 1474 - University founded.
 1475 - Printing press in use.
 1512 - Torre Nueva (clocktower) built.
 1514 - Church of Santa Engracia de Zaragoza built.
 1754 - Basilica of Our Lady of the Pillar built.
 1808 - June–August: Siege of Saragossa by French forces.
 1809 - Siege of Saragossa by French forces.
 1857 - Population: 63,399.
 1892 - Leaning Tower of Zaragoza demolished.
 1897 - Population: 98,188.

20th century

 1901 - Catholic bishop Juan Soldevilla y Romero assassinated.
 1902 - Electric tram begins operating.
 1910 -  founded.
 1916 - Iberia SC (football club) formed.
 1917 - February: Labor strike.
 1920 - Population: 141,350.
 1923 - Estadio Torrero (stadium) opens.
 1925 - Zaragoza CD (football club) formed.
 1927 - General Military Academy reestablished.
 1932 - Real Zaragoza football team formed.
 1936 - Diario de Aragón newspaper begins publication.
 1940 - Population: 238,601.
 1947 - Balay in business.
 1954 - Zaragoza Air Station built near city.
 1957 - La Romareda stadium opens.
 1960 - Population: 326,316.
 1970 - Population: 479,845.
 1979 - 12 July: Hotel Corona de Aragón fire.
 1981 - CB Zaragoza basketball team formed.
 1987 - 11 December: Zaragoza barracks bombing.
 1990
 December: Clinic of Zaragoza radiotherapy accident.
 El Periódico de Aragón newspaper begins publication.
 1991 - Population: 622,371.

21st century

 2003
 Zaragoza-Delicias railway station opens; Madrid–Barcelona high-speed rail line begins operating.
 Juan Alberto Belloch becomes mayor.
 2008 - Expo 2008 held; Water Tower built.
 2011
 Zaragoza tram Line 1 begins operating.
 Arredol news site begins publication.

See also
 Zaragoza history

References

This article incorporates information from the Spanish Wikipedia.

Bibliography

External links

 Map of Zaragoza, 1943
 Digital Public Library of America. Items related to Zaragoza, various dates

History of Zaragoza
zaragoza